Chandra Mohan Rai   is a leader of Bharatiya Janata Party from Bihar. He is a former cabinet minister. Rai was a member of Bihar Legislative Assembly . Rai fought his first election in 1967 on the Jan Sangh ticket. Later in 1977 he fought the Ramnagar constituency on the ticket of Janta Party and lost to Arjun Vikram Shah. Rai won Ramnagar constituency from BJP in 1990. Rai was part of cabinet of first and second NDA government in Bihar led by Nitish Kumar. He resigned from active politics from 2015.

References

2. http://www.travelindia-guide.com/assembly-elections/bihar/constituency-results/ramnagar.php 

Bihar MLAs 2010–2015
State cabinet ministers of Bihar
Bharatiya Janata Party politicians from Bihar
Living people
Year of birth missing (living people)
People from West Champaran district